Katrin Seibert (born 19 June 1970) is a German para badminton player who competes in international level events. She has won numerous doubles titles with Helle Sofie Sagøy in the women's events and Peter Schnitzler and Jak-Niklas Pott in the mixed doubles events.

Seibert is a sarcoma survivor and lymphedema which restricts movement in her legs.

Achievements

World Championships 

Women's singles

Women's doubles

Mixed doubles

European Championships 
Women's singles

Women's doubles

Doubles

Mixed doubles

References

Notes

External links
 
 

1970 births
Living people
German female badminton players
German para-badminton players
Paralympic badminton players of Germany
Badminton players at the 2020 Summer Paralympics
Sportspeople from Dortmund